The United States competed at the 1912 Summer Olympics in Stockholm, Sweden. 174 competitors, took part in 68 events in 11 sports. Out of the 174 athletes who had participated, 63 won medals.

Medalists

Aquatics

Diving

Two divers represented the United States. It was the nation's third appearance in diving, appearing in each edition of the diving competition. Both athletes competed in all three events. Gaidzik, the defending bronze medalist in the springboard, advanced to the final in that event and placed eighth. Neither diver advanced to the final in either of the other two events.

Rankings given are within the diver's heat.

Swimming

Seven swimmers competed for the United States at the 1912 Games. It was the nation's fifth appearance in swimming, a sport in which the United States had competed at each Olympic Games.

The American men finished with two gold medals and the corresponding Olympic records, as well as a bronze medal, in individual events. The relay team added a silver medal, and briefly held the world record after winning its semifinal heat (the Australasian team would finish with the record and the gold medal).

Ranks given for each swimmer are within the heat.

 Men

Athletics

109 athletes represented the United States. It was the fifth appearance of the nation in athletics, in which it had competed at every Olympics. The Americans won gold medals in 16 of the 30 events and finished with 42 of the 94 total medals awarded. They swept the medals in 4 events, as well as taking the top three spots in the pole vault (one gold, two silver, and three bronze medals were awarded in the event due to ties—Americans took the gold, both silvers, and one of the bronzes).

Ranks given are within that athlete's heat for running events.

Cycling

Nine cyclists represented the United States. It was the fourth appearance of the nation in cycling, which it had not appeared in only in 1896. The American cyclists won both bronze medals in the cycling competitions, with Carl Schutte taking third place in the individual competition and the fastest four Americans posting a combined time placing third in the team competition.

Road cycling

Equestrian

 Dressage

 Eventing
(The maximum score in each of the five events was 10.00 points. Ranks given are for the cumulative score after each event. Team score is the sum of the top three individual scores.)

Fencing

Thirteen fencers represented the United States. It was the third appearance of the nation in fencing. No American fencer reached the finals, though two advanced to the semifinals.

Modern pentathlon 

The United States had one competitor in the first Olympic pentathlon competition. George S. Patton, who would become a famous general during World War II, excelled in the military-influenced set of events. Patton finished in fifth place; he was the only non-Swede among the top seven finishers.

(The scoring system was point-for-place in each of the five events, with the smallest point total winning.)

Shooting 

Twenty six shooters represented the United States. It was the nation's third appearance in shooting. The Americans won a total of 14 medals, half of which were gold. Only the host nation, Sweden, did better (with two more silver medals and one more bronze).

Tennis 

A single tennis player represented the United States at the 1912 Games. It was the nation's third appearance in tennis. Pell advanced to the round of 16 before being defeated in the men's outdoor singles.

 Men

Wrestling

Greco-Roman

The United States was represented by two wrestlers at its third Olympic wrestling appearance. Both men competed in the featherweight class and lost each of their first two bouts to be eliminated from competition.

Art Competitions

References

Nations at the 1912 Summer Olympics
1912
Olympics